Indigenous peoples in Chile or Native Chileans  form about 10% of the total population of Chile. According to the 2012 census, 2,000,000 people declare having indigenous origins. Most Chileans are of partially indigenous descent, and the term and its legal ramifications are typically reserved to those who self-identify with and are accepted within one or more indigenous groups.

The Mapuche, with their traditional lands in south-central Chile, account for approximately 85% of this number. There are also small populations of Aymara, Quechua, Atacameño, Kolla, Diaguita, Yaghan, Rapa Nui and Kawaskhar in other parts of the country, as well as many other groups such as Cacahue, Chango, Picunche, Chono, Tehuelche, Cunco and Selknam.

The Indigenous Law 

Following the return to democracy, Patricio Aylwin's Concertación government established a Comisión Especial de Pueblos indígenas (Special Commission of Indigenous People), whose report provided the intellectual framework of the "Indigenous Law" (ley indígena) or law n° 19 253, promulgated on September 28, 1993 by Aylwin.

The Indigenous Law recognized in particular the Mapuche people, victims of the Occupation of the Araucanía from 1861 to 1883, as an inherent part of the Chilean nation. Other indigenous people officially recognized included Aymaras, Atacameñas, Collas, Quechuas, Rapa-Nui (Polynesian inhabitants of Easter Island), Yámanas, Kawashkars and Diaguita (since 2006). Despite this state proclamation of indigenous rights, conflicts brought by land-occupations and Mapuche's claims lead to state repression and the use of the anti-terrorist law against Mapuche activists, a law voted by the military junta.

The law established the National Corporation for Indigenous Development (CONADI), which included directly elected indigenous representatives, advised and directed government programs to assist the economic development of indigenous people.

It also gives indigenous people a voice in decisions affecting their lands, cultures, and traditions and provides for bilingual education (legalizing Mapudungun language) in schools with indigenous populations.

Approximately one-half the self-identified indigenous population remained separated from the rest of society, largely due to historical, cultural, educational, and geographical factors. Both internal factors and governmental policies limited the ability of indigenous people to participate in governmental decisions affecting their lands, cultures, traditions, and the allocation of natural resources. Indigenous people also experienced some societal discrimination and reported incidents in which they were attacked and harassed. A 2003 Ministry of Planning survey reported that indigenous people earned 26% less than nonindigenous citizens for similar work.

Chile is one of the twenty countries to have signed and ratified the only binding international law concerning indigenous peoples, Indigenous and Tribal Peoples Convention, 1989. It was adopted in 1989 as the International Labour Organization Convention 169. Chile ratified the convention in 2008. In November 2009, a court decision in Chile, considered to be a landmark in indigenous rights concerns, made use of the ILO convention 169. The Supreme Court decision on Aymara water rights upholds rulings by both the Pozo Almonte tribunal and the Iquique Court of Appeals, and marks the first judicial application of ILO Convention 169 in Chile.

Social and economical status 
However, some observers criticized a lack of transparency in CONADI's land restoration processes and favoritism of the Mapuche over other indigenous groups.

The Ministry of Education provided a package of financial aid consisting of 1,200 scholarships for indigenous elementary and high school students in the Araucania Region during 2005. The government also implemented the Indigenous Scholarship Program that benefited 36,000 low-income indigenous elementary, high school, and college students with good academic performances.

The Mapuche conflict

As of 2009, there were instances of violent confrontations between indigenous Mapuche groups and landowners, logging companies, and local government authorities in the southern part of the country. The actions took the form of protests and, occasionally, instances of rock throwing, land occupations, and burning of crops or buildings. Many of these actions were initiated by the Coordinadora Arauco Malleco (CAM), an indigenous group that has been accused of terrorist acts.

Three CAM-related Mapuches and a non-indigenous sympathizer remained imprisoned in a 2001 arson case in which antiterrorism penalties were applied. The four initiated a hunger strike in March, demanding the terrorism convictions be voided to allow their release on parole. In April the court acquitted two other individuals of all charges, criminal and terrorist, in the same case. In September the Senate rejected a proposed law to allow the release of the four imprisoned on terrorist charges. Government-sponsored legislation which would clarify the application of the antiterrorism law remained pending at year's end.

The government did not act on a United Nations special rapporteur's 2003 recommendation that there be a judicial review of cases affecting Mapuche leaders. The government had not applied the antiterrorism law in Mapuche-related prosecutions since 2002. However, it began again to apply this law in August, 2009, as the Mapuche conflict deepened following several acts of occupation and arson, as well as the killing of a Mapuche activist.

References

 
Chile